Automatic is the second studio album by English four-piece rock band Don Broco. It was released in the United Kingdom on 7 August 2015. The album was included at number 13 on Rock Sounds top 50 releases of 2015 list. On 11 November 2016, Automatic was re-released in the United States and Canada through American label SharpTone Records.

Track listing

Personnel
Credits taken from Automatics liner notes.

Don Broco
 Rob Damiani – lead vocals, electronics
 Simon Delaney – lead and rhythm guitars
 Matt Donnelly – drums, percussion, electronic beats, co-lead vocals
 Tom Doyle – bass guitar

Production
 Jason Perry – producer

Charts

Certifications

Release history

ReferencesCitationsSources'

 

2015 albums
Don Broco albums
SharpTone Records albums
Albums produced by Jason Perry
Albums recorded at AIR Studios